Islam is the most widespread religion in Bosnia and Herzegovina. It was introduced to the local population in the 15th and 16th centuries as a result of the Ottoman conquest of Bosnia and Herzegovina.

Muslims comprise the single largest religious community in Bosnia and Herzegovina (51%) (the other two large groups being Eastern Orthodox Christians (31%), almost all of whom identify as Serbs, and Roman Catholics (15%), almost all of whom identify as Croats. Another estimate done by PEW Research states that 52% of the population is Muslim, 35% Orthodox and only 8% Catholic.

Almost all of Bosnian Muslims identify as Bosniaks; until 1993, Bosnians of Muslim culture or origin (regardless of religious practice) were defined by Yugoslav authorities as Muslimani (Muslims) in an ethno-national sense (hence the capital M), though some people of Bosniak or Muslim backgrounds identified their nationality (in an ethnic sense rather than strictly in terms of citizenship) as "Yugoslav" prior to the early 1990s. A small minority of non-Bosniak Muslims in Bosnia and Herzegovina include Albanians, Roma and Turks.

Albeit traditionally adherent to Sunni Islam of the Hanafi school of jurisprudence, a 2012 survey found 54% of Bosnia and Herzegovina's Muslims to consider themselves just Muslims, while 38% told that they are Sunni Muslims. There is also a small Sufi community, located primarily in Central Bosnia. A small Shia Muslim community is also present in Bosnia. Almost all Muslim congregations in Bosnia and Herzegovina refer to the Islamic Community of Bosnia and Herzegovina as their religious organisation.

The Constitution of Bosnia and Herzegovina guarantees freedom of religion, which is generally upheld throughout the country.

History

The Ottoman era 

Islam was first introduced to the Balkans on a large scale by the Ottomans in the mid-to-late 15th century who gained control of most of Bosnia in 1463, and seized Herzegovina in the 1480s. Over the next century, the Bosnians – composed of native Christians and Slavic tribes living in the Bosnian kingdom under the name of Bošnjani – were converted to Islam in great numbers during the Islamization of Bosnia under Ottoman rule. During the Ottoman era the name Bošnjanin was definitely transformed into the current Bošnjak ('Bosniak'), with the suffix -ak replacing the traditional -anin. By the early 1600s, approximately two thirds of the population of Bosnia were Muslim. Bosnia and Herzegovina remained a province in the Ottoman Empire and gained autonomy after the Bosnian uprising in 1831. Large numbers of mosques were built all over the province. Most mosques erected during the Ottoman era were of relatively modest construction, often with a single minaret and central prayer hall with few adjoining foyers.

The Austro-Hungarian era 
After the 1878 Congress of Berlin, Bosnia and Herzegovina came under the control of Austria-Hungary. In 1908, Austria-Hungary formally annexed the region. Unlike post-Reconquista Spain, the Austro-Hungarian authorities made no attempt to convert the citizens of this newly-acquired territory as the December Constitution guaranteed freedom of religion, and so Bosnia and Herzegovina remained Muslim.

Bosnia, along with Albania and Kosovo were the only parts of the Ottoman Empire in the Balkans where large numbers of people were converted to Islam, and remained there after independence. In other areas of the former Ottoman Empire where Muslims formed the majority or started to form the majority, those Muslims were either expelled, assimilated/Christianized, massacred, or fled elsewhere (Muhajirs).

The post-war period 
Many Islamic religious buildings were damaged or destroyed in the Bosnian War during the 90s, with up to 80% of well-over 4000 different buildings, and several mosques were rebuilt with the aid of funds from Saudi Arabia and other countries from the Middle and far East.

Historically, Bosnian Muslims had always practiced a form of Islam that is strongly influenced by Sufism. Since the Bosnian War, however, some remnants of groups of foreign fighters from the Middle East fighting on the side of Bosnian Army, remained for some time and attempted to spread Wahhabism among locals. With very limited success these foreigners only created friction between local Muslim population, steeped in their own traditional practice of the faith, and without any previous contact with this strain in Islam, and themselves.
Although these communities were relatively small and peaceful, restricted to a certain number of villages around central and northern Bosnia, the issue was highly politicized by local nationalists and officials, as well as officials and diplomats from countries like Croatia, Czech Republic and Serbia, to the point of outright fiction. Security Minister of Bosnia and Herzegovina at the time, Dragan Mektić of SDS, reacted strongly on such falsehoods by pointing on seriousness of such conspiratorial claims, and warned on possibility of further dangerous politicization and even acts of violence with an aim of labeling Bosnian Muslims as radicals.

Demographics 

In the 2013 census the declared religious affiliation of the population was: Islam (1,790,454 people) and Muslim (22,068 people). Islam has 1.8 million adherents, making up about 51% of the population in Bosnia and Herzegovina. PEW survey says that there are 52% Muslims in Bosnia and Herzegovina.
The municipalities of Bužim (99.7%) and Teočak (99.7%) have the highest share of Muslims in Bosnia and Herzegovina.

Contemporary relations 

For a majority of Bosniaks that identify themselves as Muslims, religion often serves as a community linkage, and religious practice is confined to occasional visits to the mosque (especially during Ramadan and the two Eids) and significant rites of passage such as 'aqiqah, marriage, and death. Headscarves for women, or the hijab, is worn only by a minority of Bosniak women, or otherwise mostly for religious purpose (such as the çarşaf for prayer and going to the mosque).

Religious leaders from the three major faiths claim that observance is increasing among younger persons as an expression of increased identification with their ethnic heritage, in large part due to the national religious revival that occurred as a result of the Bosnian war.
Leaders from the three main religious communities observed that they enjoy greater support from their believers after the end of Bosnian war. On the other hand, however, the violence and misery caused by religious conflict has led a small number of Bosnians to reject religion altogether. This atheist community faces discrimination, and is frequently verbally attacked by religious leaders as "corrupt people without morals". According to the latest census, openly-declared atheists make up 0.79% of Bosnia's population.

In a 1998 public opinion poll, 78.3% of Bosniaks in the Federation of Bosnia and Herzegovina declared themselves to be religious.

In Bosnia and Herzegovina, there are eight muftis located in major municipalities across the country: Sarajevo, Bihać, Travnik, Tuzla, Goražde, Zenica, Mostar, and Banja Luka. The head of the Islamic Community of Bosnia and Herzegovina is Husein Kavazović.

See also

 Islamic Community of Bosnia and Herzegovina
Islamization of Bosnia and Herzegovina
Bosniaks
13th Waffen Mountain Division of the SS Handschar (1st Croatian)
Persecution of Muslims
Pomaks
 List of mosques in Bosnia and Herzegovina
 List of National Monuments of Bosnia and Herzegovina

References

Bibliography

Further reading

 
Bosnia and Herzegovina